Pseudodictamnus acetabulosus, the Greek horehound, is a species of flowering plant in the family Lamiaceae, native to south-eastern Greece, Crete, and western Turkey. Upright woolly grey shoots turn to rounded grey-green leaves, bearing whorls of small pink flowers with funnel-shaped green calyces in late summer and autumn. It is tolerant of poor soil and drought, and often used in cultivation as groundcover.

References

Taxa named by Carl Linnaeus
Flora of Greece
Flora of Crete
Flora of Turkey
Lamiaceae